Alexander Evgenievich Udodov (born 10 June 1969) is a Russian-based businessperson and real estate and property developer. He is the founder of Aforra Group, a real estate and property development company based in Moscow. Udodov is also an investor in agriculture and is a board member of the Eurasian Pipeline Consortium.

Biography 
Alexander Evgenievich Udodov was born on 10 June 1969 in the city of Kizilyurt of the Dagestan Autonomous Soviet Socialist Republic, in the USSR. He served in the Soviet military for three years before studying at Kiev University with a law degree in 2001.

Business 
In 2004, he acquired a majority shareholding in VG Cargo GmbH a German logistics and freight company that specializes in high value air cargo. In 2014 VG Cargo developed a cargo terminal in Frankfurt International airport. In 2018 Udodov announced plans to increase VG Cargo's air cargo capacity to 90 thousand tons, a 10% boost from the previous year.

Real-Estate 
In 2015 Alexander Udodov founded the Aforra Group, which provides property development services as well as real estate management. Udodov's property portfolio includes five shopping centers, four in Moscow and one in Kaluga. In 2016, he was awarded a contract from the Ministry of Resorts, Tourism and Olympic Heritage of the Krasnodar Territory to develop a balneological resort in the Krasnodar region. The resort, based on the existing ruins of the Solnechny sanatorium, is to be completed in 2019 with capacity to host up to 5,000 people per year.

Import substitution 
In 2017 Alexander Udodov founded an import-substitution project called Mushroom Rainbow, which specializes in greenhouse production of champignon mushrooms using new forms of composting technology. The project was backed by Alfa-Bank.  In May 2018 the second phase of the project was launched making the company the largest producer of champignon mushrooms in Russia with a capacity of 11,000 tons, which is forecast to increase to 17,000 tons by 2019.  Mushroom Rainbow aims to eventually cover approximately 20% of the Russian fresh mushroom market.

Donations 
Since 2009, Alexander Udodov has been a contributor to the restoration of the Kornilie-Paleostrovsky monastery on Paliiy Island in Karelia. The monastery was almost completely destroyed during the Soviet era.

OFAC Sanctions 
The United States Department of the Treasury Office of Foreign Assets Control (OFAC) announced sanctions against Udodov as part of renewed efforts to isolate the Russian Federation following its invasion of Ukraine.  The sanctions are authorized under  and cover companies owned or controlled by Udodov; they include companies not only in the Russian Federation, but the Czech Republic, British Virgin Islands, and the Bahamas.

References 

Russian business executives
1969 births
Living people
People from Kizilyurt